NSRL is primarily the acronym for Nationalsozialistischer Reichsbund für Leibesübungen, the Sports Office of the Third Reich. The NSRL was disbanded in 1945 after Nazi Germany's defeat in World War II, when the American Military Government issued a special law outlawing the Nazi party and all of its branches. 

NSRL may refer, however, to the following organizations created later:

National Software Reference Library, a project of the National Institute of Standards and Technology designed to collect software from various sources
National Synchrotron Radiation Laboratory, University of Science and Technology of China, Hefei
NASA Space Radiation Laboratory at Brookhaven National Laboratory (BNL), Upton, NY
Natural Science Research Laboratory, Museum of Texas Tech University 
Nova Scotia Resources Limited, a consulting firm for oil exploration in the Scotian Shelf
The now defunct Nuclear Structure Research Laboratory of the University of Rochester
National Salmonella Reference Laboratory, NUI Galway
Networks and Services Research Laboratory of the UCL Department of Electronic & Electrical Engineering 
Neuroscience Statistics Research Lab at MIT
The NSRL - INSTAAR Laboratory for AMS Radiocarbon Preparation and Research of the University of Colorado at Boulder
National SIGINT (Signal Intelligence) Requirements List of the National Security Agency/Central Security Service (NSA/CSS) 
National Soybean Research Lab at the University of Illinois
Nike's Sport Research Lab
Network Services Research Laboratory at AT&T
Novell Support Resource Library at Novell corporation
National Senior Robotics League, the robot competition at the Institute of Technical Education, Singapore 
NegativeSum Racing League 
NASCAR Sim Racing League

Other
No Significant Risk Level, used mainly in Safe Drinking Water and Toxic Enforcement Act codes or regulations
North-South Rail Link, the name for a proposed rail tunnel in Boston, Massachusetts